West Thumb may refer to the following features in Yellowstone National Park:
The most western portion of Yellowstone Lake formed by a volcanic eruption 174,000 years ago
West Thumb Geyser Basin, a thermal area on the shores of that portion of Yellowstone Lake
West Thumb Junction, used to refer to the general area of the park, often used interchangeably with nearby Grant Village